World Forum may refer to:

 AEI World Forum, an annual summit sponsored by the American Enterprise Institute
 Social and Environmental Responsibility World Forum
 World Forum (The Hague), a convention center in The Hague
 World Forum", or "World Forum/Communist Quiz", a sketch by Monty Python first appearing on Monty Python's Flying Circus in 1970
World Forum for Democracy a annually gathering of the Council of Europe